Calycoseris parryi, the yellow tackstem, is a spring wildflower found in the Mojave Desert, the Sonoran Desert, and surrounding regions of the southwestern United States and northwestern Mexico. It is found in California, Nevada, Utah, Arizona, and Baja California.

Calycoseris parryi grows up to 30 centimeters (12 inches) tall in sandy soils below 6,000 feet. The plant has yellow flowers with leaves up to 4.5 inches (11.25 cm) long, and is part of the Sunflower Family.

References

External links
  Calflora Database: Calycoseris parryi (Yellow tackstem)
 Jepson Manual eFlora (TJM2) treatment of Calycoseris parryi
 USDA Plants Profile for Calycoseris parryi (yellow tackstem)
The American Southwest: Calycoseris parryi
 UC CalPhotos gallery of Calycoseris parryi (yellow tackstem)

parryi
Flora of the California desert regions
Flora of Baja California
Flora of the Southwestern United States
Natural history of the Mojave Desert
North American desert flora
Plants described in 1859
Taxa named by Asa Gray